Marine Corps Recruit Depot may refer to:
 Marine Corps Recruit Depot Parris Island
 Marine Corps Recruit Depot San Diego

See also 
 List of United States Marine Corps installations